Veratraldehyde (3,4-dimethoxybenzaldehyde) is an organic compound that is widely used as a flavorant and odorant.  The compound is structurally related to benzaldehyde.

This compound is popular commercially because of its pleasant woody fragrance.  It is derivative of vanillin, from which it is prepared by methylation.

Uses
Veratraldehyde can be used as an intermediate in the synthesis of some pharmaceutical drugs including amiquinsin, hoquizil, piquizil, prazosin, quinazoline, tiapamil, toborinone, verazide, and vetrabutine.

See also
3,4,5-Trimethoxybenzaldehyde

References 

Benzaldehydes
Phenol ethers